Podgórze is a district of Kraków, Poland, situated on the right (southern) bank of the Vistula River, at the foot of Lasota Hill. The district was subdivided in 1990 into six new districts, see present-day districts of Kraków for more details. The name Podgórze roughly translates as the base of a hill. Initially a small settlement, in the years following the First Partition of Poland the town's development was promoted by the Austria-Hungary Emperor Joseph II who in 1784 granted it the city status, as the Royal Free City of Podgórze. In the following years it was a self-governing administrative unit. After the Third Partition of Poland in 1795 and the takeover of the entire city by the Empire, Podgórze lost its political role of an independent suburb across the river from the Old Town.

The administrative reform of 1810 which followed the expansion of the Duchy of Warsaw brought Podgórze together with the rest of the historic city. However, after the Congress of Vienna made Kraków a free city in 1815, Podgórze fell back under the Austrian rule and remained there for the rest of the 19th century. According to Encyclopædia Britannica, in 1910 it was the 13th largest town in the Austrian-ruled Galicia (population 18,142 in 1900). In the years leading to the return of Polish independence, the city council discussions from July 1915 made Podgórze again a part of the Greater Kraków (Wielki Kraków); its president, the vice president of a single administrative unit.

Brief history
The oldest man-made structure in Podgórze is the Krakus Mound on Lasota Hill, believed to be the grave of the legendary prince Krakus. It is the largest prehistoric mound in Poland and one of the best view points in the city.

The Austrian bridge named Carl's Bridge, linking Podgórze with the Kraków proper across the Vistula was built in 1802. This wooden structure located between today's Mostowa and Brodzińskiego streets, survived only until 1813 when it was destroyed in a flood.

Towards the end of the Austrian rule, in 1915 the size of Podgórze reached  of the size of Kraków. Since the return of Poland's independence, it remained integrated into the city. It includes the historic part of Podgórze with the triangular market square and impressive St. Joseph Church as well as the green hills of Krzemionki with the World War II quarry called Liban attached to the infamous Plaszow concentration camp. It also includes the site of the Nazi Kraków Ghetto and a factory of Oskar Schindler who saved nearly 1,200 Jews from the camps, as well as the old villages (now suburbs) of Płaszów, Rybitwy and Przewóz. 

Jews from Krakow and the nearby villages were ordered to move into the created ghetto, an area of about 20 hectares, until March 20, 1941. Once the so-called 'Special Resettlement Commission' identified 2 square meters of living space for each inhabitant as suitable, about 18,000 people, several families in an apartment, were now cramped into a small area inside Podgorze district. Initially, the area was surrounded with barbed wire under security, and as early as April 1941, a three-meter-high wall was erected around the perimeter, the upper part of which replicated the shape of the Jewish gravestones.

The district population as of 31 December, 2006 was 31,599 at an area of 2,456 ha.

Notable people 
 Edward Dembowski, Polish philosopher, journalist and independence activist, died here
 Arthur Dunkelblum, Jewish Belgian chess master, born here
 Salomon Bochner, Jewish American mathematician, born here
 Ignacy Friedmann (Freudmann), a Jewish pianist, composer, born here
 Józef Hofmann, born here
 Aleksander Kotsis, died here
 Bernard Offen, Holocaust survivor, author, lived here
 Poldek Pfefferberg, Holocaust survivor, taught at the Kościuszko Gymnasium as a professor
 Oskar Schindler, German businessman credited with saving the lives of 1,200 Jews in Poland 
 Albin Francisco Schoepf, born here
 Mike Staner, Holocaust survivor, author, born here
 Roman Polanski, Polish film director, Holocaust survivor, lived here during World War II

See also 
 Krakus Mound
 Kraków Ghetto was located in the central part of Podgórze
 Operation Reinhard in Kraków during the Holocaust in Poland
 Large parts of the 1993 film Schindler's List were shot in nearby Kazimierz - not at the original places in Podgórze
 Tadeusz Pankiewicz, Polish Righteous
 Jewish Culture Festival in Kazimierz part of Kraków Old Town

References

External links 

 Podgórze District Council official page 
 Pogórze historical route from the municipality of Kraków website
 Association PODGORZE.PL site of the association of friends of the district with descriptions of the main sites of interests in several languages.

Districts of Kraków
Shtetls
Historic Jewish communities in Europe
Holocaust locations in Poland